Xandrames latiferaria is a moth of the family Geometridae first described by Francis Walker in 1860. It is found in Japan, China, the north-eastern parts of the Himalayas and Sundaland.

In genitalia and facies Xandrames cnecozona resembles typical X. latiferaria but is slightly larger and yellower. It is considered a synonym but might merit subspecific status.

The wingspan is 50–60 mm.

The larvae feed on Lindera species.

Subspecies
Xandrames latiferaria latiferaria
Xandrames latiferaria recondita
Xandrames latiferaria curvistriga
Xandrames latiferaria mulsa

External links

Xandrames latiferaria latiferaria at Japanese Moths
Xandrames latiferaria recondita at Japanese Moths

Boarmiini
Moths of Japan